Three Star Club is a Nepali professional football club based in Patan, Lalitpur, that competes in the Qatar Airways Martyr's Memorial A-Division League, the top flight of Nepalese football.

The club was previously known as the Laxmi Bank Three Star Club and Ruslan Three Star Club for sponsorship reasons. Historically they have fierce rivalry with Manang Marshyangdi Club known as the Patan-Kathmandu derby.

History
Three Star Club is one of the well-established and successful clubs in Nepal. The club had a modest beginning in 2031 B.S. A group of enthusiastic young people of Patan Durbar Square, Mangal Bazar established the club for sports development, social service, personality development and brotherhood. The club has been organizing many activities since then, but it is more recognizable as one of the leading football teams in the country. The number of members is increasing rapidly. Currently, Three Star Club has 380 life members and 129 general members.

Three Star Club's football journey started from D-Division league. The club managed to reach A-Division league in 2039 B.S. Since then, Three Star Club has produced steady stream of qualitative performance in national and international tournaments. Four times national league champion, the club has an avid fan following in the country and boasts of many national players. They have their own official fan group named "We Are Stars". They last won the National League in 2015. In the recent 2018 season, they finished third below Manang Marshyangdi club and Sankata Club.

2016–17 controversy
The champions of 2015 Nepal National League, Three Star Club was eligible to play in the 2017 AFC Cup qualifying round taking place in Ulaanbaatar. The club topped its group winning one and drawing the other match, for which they were qualified to play in the 2017 AFC Cup. However, the All Nepal Football Association (ANFA) failed to register Three Star Club for the cup by the competition deadline, so they were not able to continue competing in the 2017 AFC Cup. In December 2016, the club therefore demanded a compensation payment of NPR 60 Million. On 10 October 2017, the ANFA and Three Star Club agreed on a settlement payment of  NPR 15 million in three installments. The club would then return to competitive football, in which it had not participated since the scandal began. ANFA pledged to arrange three international competitions in which Three Star club would be able to participate.

Kit manufacturers and shirt sponsors

Current squad

Honours

National 
Martyr's Memorial A-Division League
Champions (4): 1997, 1998, 2004, 2012–13

Nepal National League
Champions (1): 2015

Satashi Gold Cup
Winners (1): 2020

Invitational
Bordoloi Trophy
Champions (1): 2016
Runners-up (1): 2010

Kalinga Cup
Runners-up (1): 2010

Continental
 AFC President's Cup: Semi-Finalist (2005)

Regional
 Dipendra Gold Cup, Kathmandu: 1 (1981)
 Mani Mukunda Gold Cup, Palpa: 1 (1984)
 Mahendra Gold Cup, Birgunj: 1 (1995)
 North Bengal Gold Cup, India: 2 (1997, 2001)
 Jana Andolan-2 Smriti Gold Cup, Heatuda: 1 (2007)
 30th All India Governor's Gold Cup, India: 1 (2008)
 Aaha Gold Cup, Pokhara: 4 (2007, 2011, 2013, 2015)
 Budha Subba Gold Cup, Dharan: 5 (2005, 2007, 2009, 2012, 2018)
 British Gurkha Cup, Kathmandu: 2 (2010, 2011)
 Tilotama Gold Cup, Butwal: 1 (2018)
 Madan Bhandari Memorial Ithari Gold Cup: 1 (2019)
 Birat Gold Cup, Biratnagar: 1 (2018)
 His Majesty's Birthday Cup, Kathmandu: Runner-up (1984, 2005)
 Santosh Trophy, Bara: Runner-up (1984)
 Earthquake Victim Gold Cup, Ilam: Runner-up (1997)
 Bijaya Memorial Gold Cup, India: Runner-up (1997)
 29th All India Governor's Gold Cup: Runner-up (2007)

League finishes
The season-by-season performance of TSC since the first title in 1997:

References

External links
Official website

Association football clubs established in 1954
Football clubs in Nepal
1954 establishments in Nepal